Betty Ann Norton (5 July 1936 – 5 June 2020) was an Irish drama teacher and founder of the Betty Ann Norton Theatre School and actor agency.

Background
Norton was born in 1936 and grew up in Dublin near the South Circular Road. Her mother, Frances, played the violin and her father, Eugene, was a baritone singer. Frances was a full-time homemaker while Eugene worked as manager of the Bacon Shops on Grafton Street. One of two children, her younger brother Jim Norton also became a successful actor. She attended school at St Louis High School, Rathmines.

Training
Norton attended the Ena Mary Burke School of Drama and Elocution on Kildare Street, Dublin, where Hollywood star Maureen O'Hara had also trained. Norton's acting school offers an annual Ena Mary Burke scholarship in Burke's honour.

Norton was a Licentiate of the Guildhall School of Music and Drama (LGSM) in London and Associate of the Royal Irish Academy of Music (ARIAM) in Dublin. She was a member of the Dublin Shakespeare Society.

Theatre school
Norton originally planned to become an actor, but her family did not approve and her mother Frances encouraged her to become a teacher. In 1959 Norton established the Betty Ann Norton Theatre School on Harcourt Street in Dublin. Her husband, Michael, was co-director of the school. According to Norton, changes to traffic by the new Luas tram system caused the business to change premises to her childhood school, St Louis High School, Rathmines, in 2006.

Alumni of the School include:
 Claudia Boyle, opera singer
 Claudia Carroll, actor and author
 Peter Crawley, art critic for The Irish Times
 Jim Culleton, actor
 Pádraic Delaney, actor
 Moya Doherty, founder of RIverdance
 Emma Donoghue, author and playwright
 Danielle Galligan, actor
 Ruth Gilligan, author
 Amy Huberman, actor and author
 Dervla Kirwan, actor
 Áine Lawlor, broadcaster
 Justine Mitchell, actor
 Diarmuid Noyes, actor
 Hugh O'Conor, actor
 Jim O'Hanlon, director
 Shane O'Reilly, actor
 Marian Richardson, broadcaster, actor, and producer
 Eleanor Shanley, singer

Personal life
Norton met her husband Michael J. Cunneen on the Aran Islands in 1965 and they married in 1967. They lived in Dún Laoghaire. Michael died in the Blackrock Clinic on 12 May 2017.

Death
Norton died in the Beacon Hospital on 5 June 2020 at the age of 83. She was cremated and interred at Mount Jerome Cemetery and Crematorium. President of Ireland, Michael D. Higgins, paid tribute to Norton, describing her as a "theatre legend" and "one of our foremost theatre teachers".

References 

1930s births
2020 deaths
Theatre people from Dublin (city)
Alumni of the Guildhall School of Music and Drama
Alumni of the Royal Irish Academy of Music
Year of birth missing